Kahan Hai Kanoon is a 1989 Bollywood film produced and directed by Deepak Balraj Vij. It stars Aditya Pancholi, Kimi Katkar, Mandakini in pivotal roles. The music was composed by Bappi Lahiri.

Music
Lyrics: Shaily Shailendra

External links
 

1989 films
1980s Hindi-language films
Films scored by Bappi Lahiri